Hollum is the largest village on Ameland, Netherlands, one of the West Frisian Islands. It is situated on the westernmost part of the island and had, as of January 2017, a population of 1,165.

The village was first mentioned in 1485 as Hollum, and could mean "settlement on a hill/island", however there are more possiblities. Hollum developed as an esdorp in the Late Middle Ages. It was originally two settlements which have grown together.

Culture
Prominent in the village is a Dutch Reformed church with foundations from the 12th century and a lighthouse, which is 59 m high, dating from 1880. Another notable feature is the Commandeur huuskes. Commandeur refers to the captain of a whaling ship, as were used during the 18th century to hunt in the Arctic Ocean.

Another notable tourist attraction is the Sorgdragersmuseum, a history museum. The smock mill De Verwachting is in working order.

References

External links

Ameland
Populated places in Friesland